Count Friedrich August von Harrach-Rohrau, (Vienna, 8 June 1696 – Vienna, 4 June 1749), was plenipotentiary minister of the Austrian Netherlands (1732–1741) and became Governor-General ad interim in 1741–1744.
He was also High Chancellor of Bohemia from 1745 until his death.

Early life
By birth member of the House of Harrach, he was born as the eldest son and child of Count Aloys Thomas Raimund von Harrach und Rohrau (1669–1742) and his second wife Countess Anna Caecilie von Thannhausen (1674–1721).

Marriage and issue
He married Princess Maria Eleonora of Liechtenstein (1703 – 17 July 1757), the youngest daughter of Prince Anton Florian of Liechtenstein and his wife Countess Eleonore Barbara von Thun und Hohenstein, on 5 February 1719. They had 16 children:

Franz Anton (13 May 1720 – 25 March 1724)
Maria Rosa (20 August 1721 – 29 August 1785) Who married her paternal uncle Ferdinand Bonaventura II von Harrach
Johann Josef (18 September 1722 – 8 December 1746)
Ernst Guido (8 September 1723 – 23 March 1783); his successor
Maria Anna (27 April 1725 – 29 April 1780)
Anna Viktoria (1726 – 6 January 1746)
Maria Josepha (20 November 1727 – 15 February 1788); married her cousin, Prince Johann Nepomuk Karl of Liechtenstein
Maximilian Josef (13 September 1729 – 6 March 1730)
Bonaventura  (20 March 1731 – 14 February 1794)
Ignaz Ludwig (2 October 1732 – 11 March 1753)
Franz Xaver (2 October 1732 – 15 February 1781)
Johann Leopold (12 December 1733 – 27 September 1734)
Maria Elisabeth (19 May 1735 – 9 June 1735)
Ferdinand (4 January 1737 – 27 March 1748)
Johann Nepomuk Ernst (20 May 1738 – 17 December 1739)
Maria Christina (24 July 1740 – 27 November 1791)

Descendants
Ernst Guido's great-great-grandson was Lieutenant Colonel Count Franz von Harrach, Archduke Franz Ferdinand of Austria's Aide-de-camp when he was assassinated in Sarajevo on 28 June 1914.

External links
Picture and Biography (in Czech)

Literature 
Ghislaine De Boom, Les ministres plénipotentaires dans les Pays-Bas autrichiens, principalement Cobenzl, Brussels: Académie Royale de Belgique (1932).

Ghislaine De Boom, "L'Archiduchesse Marie-Elisabeth et les Grands Maitres de la cour", Revue Belge de Philologie et d'Histoire 5/2-3 (1926), pp. 495–506.

1696 births
1749 deaths
Nobility from Vienna
Counts of Austria
Governors of the Habsburg Netherlands
Politicians of the Austrian Netherlands
Knights of the Golden Fleece of Austria